The Lankao–Nanyang Expressway, often abbreviated as Lannan Expressway and designated as S83 in Henan's expressway system, is  long regional expressway in Henan, China.

History
The first phase of the expressway is from Xuchang to Nanyang via Pingdingshan and was called as Xupingnan Expressway. This section was opened on 12 December 2004 and provided expressway connections to the above mentioned three major cities in Henan. The second phase (Lankao–Xuchang section) was opened on 19 November 2005. The third phase was opened on December 19 2005.

The Xuchang–Ye County section has also been designated into G0421 Xuguang Expressway.

Exits list
From northeast to southwest:

References

Expressways in Henan
Transport in Henan